May Louise Cooper Spindle (January 1, 1885 - October 1968) was an American composer and teacher who wrote many pedagogical pieces for piano.

Spindle was born in Muskegon, Michigan, to Rosina H. Winters and Charles Bicknell Cooper. She married Lee Addison Spindle in 1911.

Spindle began music lessons with her mother and later attended the Chicago Musical College. Her teachers included Felix Borowski, Glen Dillard, Laurence Powell, Hans von Schiller, Charles Vogan, and Max Wald. She socialized with composer Eleanor Everest Freer.

Spindle belonged to the American Society of Composers, Author, and Publishers (ASCAP), the Michigan Composers Club, and the Music Teachers National Association. In 1937, she was the Grand Rapids winner of the Michigan State Composers Contest. She taught at Columbia University.

Spindle's music was published by Bach Music Co./Harry Dellafield, Forster Music Publisher Inc., and Mills Music. In addition to pedagogical pieces for piano, her compositions included:

Chamber 

Caprice Espagnole (violin and piano)

Orchestra 

Southlands Suite

Organ 

Prelude of Spring

Piano 

Bouncy Balls
Holiday in Naples
Parade of the Bunnies
Ping Pong
Somersaults Rndoletto: Study in Crossing Hands and Staccato
Swaying Pussywillows

Vocal 

“April Wind”
“Christmas Roundelay”
City Eternal (cantata)
“God’s Gift Supreme”
Moon Magic (arranged for 2 or 3-part chorus)
My Dream Ship (arranged for 2, 3, or 4-part chorus)
Pickaninny Song (text by Helen Von Kolnitz Hyer; arranged for 2 or 3-part chorus) (E)

References 

American women composers
1885 births
1968 deaths
Chicago Musical College alumni
ASCAP
Columbia University faculty